Ariane Schréder is a French writer. She is known for her novels Et mon luth constellé and La Silencieuse (2013). The latter won the René-Fallet prize and the Folire prize. She lives in Paris.

References

 

French women writers
French writers
Living people
Year of birth missing (living people)
Place of birth missing (living people)